Liechtenstein competed at the 1948 Summer Olympics in London, England.

Results by event

Athletics
Decathlon - Men's Competition
 Gebhard Büchel
 Josef Seger

References
Official Olympic Reports

Nations at the 1948 Summer Olympics
1948
1948 in Liechtenstein